100 Flowers may refer to:

 Hundred Flowers Campaign, a Chinese political movement
 Hundred Flowers Awards, an annual film award voted by Chinese audiences
 Hundred Flowers (newspaper), a Minneapolis underground newspaper of the 1970s
 Urinals (band), previous name of the punk rock band 100 Flowers